An anodyne is a type of drug.

Anodyne may also refer to:

 Anodyne (album), by Uncle Tupelo
 Anodyne (band), an American hardcore band
 Anodyne (video game), a 2013 independent video game
 Anodyne morphism
 Anodyne Records